Siyabonga Thwala (born 8 September 1969) is a South African television and stage actor, television host, producer and businessman. He is most well known for his role of Mpiyakhe Zungu on Mzansi Magic's Isibaya. Siyabonga Thwala has starred and appeared in a number of high profile television shows in South Africa winning multiple awards for his acting.

He starred as newspaper publisher Vusi Zwane opposite Luthuli Dlamini on e.tv's Scandal! when the first went on air in 2005, a role that would earn him his first South African Film and Television Award. In 2007 he joined the cast of Generations as Paul Mashaba opposite Seputla Sebogodi. Siyabonga Thwala also portrayed the character of Busani Mojalefa on Muvhango and briefly returned to e.tv as DH Radebe on Rhythm City (TV series) opposite Jamie Bartlett. In 2018 he created and hosted a documentary series, Yobe (A Zulu word for "Forgive").

Career
Thwala began his acting career in 1989. He made his screen acting debut in the 1996 made-for-TV movie Born Free: A New Adventure. In the same year, he played a cameo in an episode of the television series Tarzan: The Epic Adventures entitled “Tarzan and the Scarlet Diamond” (Season 1, Episode 5).In 1998 he was offered the role of Godlieb Mofokeng in the new SABC 3 soapie Isidingo but turned it down as he felt he was not ready for a longterm commitment to television. Shortly after, he was cast on TV sitcom Streaks based on a Cape Town hair salon, where he acted alongside now veteran actor Themba Ndaba. In 2003 he was cast in the recurring role of Jimmy on Gazlam.

Siyabonga Thwala rose to fame through the role of Vusi Zwane on the e.tv then new soap opera, Scandal!.His role went onto earn him a Golden Horn Award (South African Film and Television Award) for Best Actor in a TV Soap.

In 2007, he was cast in the role of Paul Mashaba, the journalist younger brother of ruthless businessman Kenneth Mashaba played by Seputla Sebogodi, on SABC 1's Generations. he left the show in 2010.

In 2013, he earned was is arguably the biggest role of his career to date, as taxi-boss Mpiyakhe Zungu on Mzansi Magic's highly acclaimed Isibaya. The role of Mpiyakhe Zungu became so well loved by the viewers of the show that for most of the shows history, the character has been the central figure of which the story has been written around. The role earned him the 2014 South African Film and Television Award for Best Actor in a TV Drama.

Siyabonga Thwala joined the cast of Muvhango in a leading role as Busani Mojalefa. In the same year he appeared on e.tv's Rhythm City as DH Radebe. He also appeared on the HIV/AIDS drama series Intersexions winning him his 2nd South African Film and Television Award in 2014 for Best Actor in TV drama.

Siyabonga Thwala created and hosted the a documentary series, Yobe, which sort to unite victims and perpetrators - and have then come to a point of understanding and forgiveness. In 2019, he was cast in the award-winning political drama-thriller, The Republic as corrupt former President Hendrik where he starred alongside Florence Masebe & Hlomla Dandala.

Awards

 2007 South African Film and Television Awards for Best Actor in a TV Soap (Scandal!)
 2014 South African Film and Television Awards for Best Actor in a TV Soap (Isibaya)
 2014 South African Film and Television Awards for Best Actor in TV Drama Series (Intersexions)
 2014 Royalty Soapie Awards for Outstanding actor in Soap (Isibaya)

References

External links 
 The Nation News
 Siyabonga Thwala biography
TVSA biography of Siyabonga Thwala

Living people
1969 births